Frank Mott may refer to:

 Frank Luther Mott (1886–1964), American historian and journalist
 Frank K. Mott (1866–1958), mayor of Oakland, California